The 1993 Irish Masters was the nineteenth edition of the professional invitational snooker tournament, which took place from 23 to 28 March 1993. The tournament was played at Goffs in Kill, County Kildare, and featured twelve professional players.

Steve Davis won the title for the seventh time, beating Alan McManus 9–4 in the final.

Main draw

References

Irish Masters
Irish Masters
Irish Masters
Irish Masters